Souleymane Camara (born 22 December 1982) is a Senegalese former professional footballer who played as a forward. He is a former Senegal international and has represented his nation at the 2002 FIFA World Cup and three Africa Cup of Nations tournaments in 2002, 2006, and 2012. As of 2021, he holds the record of the most appearances for French club Montpellier, with 433, and is the club's second-highest goalscorer, with 76 goals.

Club career
Camara was influential in Montpellier winning their first ever Ligue 1 title in 2012, scoring 9 goals, including one goal in a crucial 2–0 victory over Rennes with two matches left in the season.

On 5 August 2017, Camara scored the only goal in Montpellier's 1–0 win against Caen on matchday 1 of the 2017–18 season. It was his 48th Ligue 1 goal for Montpellier and made him Montpellier's record scorer in Ligue 1, breaking Laurent Blanc's 26-year-old record of 47 Division 1 goals scored for Montpellier in four seasons.

In March 2019 he became the first player to score in 15 different seasons in France's Ligue 1 in the 21st century. In May 2019 he extended his contract with Montpellier for a further season.

In May 2020, it was announced that Camara would not extend his contract with Montpellier, and would retire at the end of the season. By the end of his Montpellier career, Camara played a club-record 433 games in all competitions during his 13-year stay with 76 goals scored – a record bettered only by France legend Laurent Blanc.

Honours
Monaco
 Coupe de la Ligue: 2002–03

Montpellier
 Ligue 1: 2011–12
Senegal
Africa Cup of Nations runner-up: 2002

References

External links

1982 births
Living people
Association football forwards
Senegalese footballers
Senegal international footballers
AS Monaco FC players
En Avant Guingamp players
OGC Nice players
Montpellier HSC players
Ligue 1 players
Ligue 2 players
Senegalese expatriate footballers
Senegalese Muslims
Expatriate footballers in France
Expatriate footballers in Monaco
2002 FIFA World Cup players
2002 African Cup of Nations players
2006 Africa Cup of Nations players
2012 Africa Cup of Nations players
Senegalese expatriate sportspeople in France
Senegalese expatriate sportspeople in Monaco